SilkAir Flight 185 was a scheduled international passenger flight operated by a Boeing 737-300 from Soekarno–Hatta International Airport in Jakarta, Indonesia to Changi Airport in Singapore that crashed into the Musi River near Palembang, Sumatra, on 19 December 1997, killing all 97 passengers and seven crew on board.

The cause of the crash was independently investigated by two agencies in two countries: the U.S. National Transportation Safety Board (NTSB) and the Indonesian National Transportation Safety Committee (NTSC). The NTSB, which had jurisdiction based on Boeing's manufacture of the aircraft in the U.S., investigated the crash under lead investigator Greg Feith. Its investigation concluded that the crash was the result of deliberate flight-control inputs "most likely by the captain". While the Indonesian NTSC investigators found "no concrete evidence" to support the pilot suicide allegation, and the previously suspected Parker-Hannifin hydraulic power control unit (PCU) had already been determined by the manufacturer to be defect-free, the final statement from the NTSC was that they were unable to determine a cause of the crash and was thus inconclusive.

Regardless of the findings, it is still believed to be possible that the Parker-Hannifin-made PCU that controlled the aircraft's rudder could have been defective and thereby led to the crash. The cause of some previous 737 crashes, such as United Airlines Flight 585 and USAir Flight 427, had been attributed to the 737's rudder issues. Although the NTSB and PCU manufacturer Parker-Hannifin had already determined that the PCU was properly working, and thus not the cause of the crash, a private and independent investigation into the crash for a civil lawsuit tried by jury in Los Angeles County Superior Court, which was not allowed to hear or consider the NTSB's and Parker-Hannifin's conclusions, decided that the crash was caused by a defective servo valve inside the PCU based on forensic findings from an electron microscope, which determined that minute defects within the PCU had caused the rudder hard-over and a subsequent uncontrollable flight and crash. The manufacturer of the aircraft's rudder controls and the families later reached an out-of-court settlement.

Aircraft
The aircraft operating flight 185 was a Boeing 737-300 with manufacturer serial number 28556, registered as 9V-TRF and was powered by two CFM56-3B2 engines. Having completed its maiden flight on 27 January 1997, the aircraft was delivered to SilkAir on 14 February, 10 months before the crash. At the time of the accident, it was the newest aircraft in SilkAir's fleet and had accumulated more than 2,200 flight hours in 1,300 cycles. This is the first and only fatal hull loss for SilkAir in the airline's history.

Incident
Carrying 97 passengers and a crew of seven, the Boeing 737 departed Jakarta's Soekarno–Hatta International Airport's runway 25R at 15:37 local time (08:37 UTC) for a planned 80-minute flight to Singapore's Changi Airport, with captain Tsu Way Ming, 41, of Singapore, a former A-4 Skyhawk pilot, at the controls, along with first officer Duncan Ward, 23, of New Zealand.

At 15:47:06, while climbing through , the crew requested clearance to proceed directly to waypoint . At 15:53, the crew reported reaching the cruise altitude of FL350 and was cleared to proceed directly to PARDI, and to report abeam Palembang. The cockpit voice recorder (CVR) ceased recording at 16:05. The documentary television series Mayday argues Captain Tsu may have taken the opportunity of leaving the cockpit for tripping the CVR circuit breaker to turn off the CVR. At 16:10, air traffic controllers informed the flight that it was abeam Palembang and instructed the aircraft to maintain FL350 and to contact Singapore Control upon reaching PARDI. First Officer Ward acknowledged this call. At 16:11, nearly 6 minutes after the CVR ceased recording, the flight data recorder (FDR) also stopped recording. Mayday shows that Tsu is thought to have come up with an excuse to get Ward out of the cockpit. Having done so, the pilot then proceeded to lock his co-pilot out of the flight deck before disabling the FDR; Tsu is presumed to have done this to ensure that  no record would be made of what he was going to do next.

Flight 185 remained level at FL350 until it started a rapid and nearly vertical dive around 16:12. While descending through , parts of the aircraft, including a great extent of the tail section, started to separate from the aircraft's fuselage due to high forces arising from the nearly supersonic dive. Seconds later, the aircraft hit the Musi River, near Palembang, Sumatra, killing all 104 people on board. The time it took the aircraft to dive from cruise altitude into the river was less than one minute. The plane was travelling faster than the speed of sound for a few seconds before impact. Parts of the wreckage were embedded  into the riverbed.

The aircraft broke into pieces before impact, with the debris spread over a wide area, though most of the wreckage was concentrated in a single  by  area at the river bottom. No complete body, body part, or limb was found, as the entire aircraft and passengers disintegrated upon impact. Only six positive identifications were later obtained from the few recovered human remains.

Passengers and crew
SilkAir issued a press release on 19 December 1997 with a passenger count by nationality, and another the following day with crew details and a complete passenger manifest.

Among those killed in the crash was Singaporean model and author Bonny Hicks.

Investigation and final report

The accident was investigated by the Indonesian NTSC, which was assisted by expert groups from the US, Singapore, and Australia.

Around 73% of the wreckage (by weight) was recovered, partially reconstructed, and examined. Both of the aircraft recorders, the CVR and the FDR, were retrieved from the river and their data were extracted and analyzed.

The investigators tested 20 different simulations for various equipment-failure scenarios, and found that the only scenario that matched the actual radar trajectory of the descent and crash of the flight was a high-speed steep dive commanded by one of the pilots. Furthermore, the investigators had found the trim jackscrew for the horizontal stabilizer, which revealed that flight inputs from one of the pilots had moved the stabilizer from level flight to a full nose-down descent.

First Officer Duncan Ward was initially speculated to have deliberately crashed the aircraft, as he was the only person in the cockpit when the CVR stopped recording, but this was quickly ruled out, as Ward's friends, family, and co-workers said that he had not displayed any signs of depression nor suicidality during his career at SilkAir, and was in a good mood on the morning of the accident flight.

At 16:00, the CVR showed that Captain Tsu left the cockpit; five minutes later, the CVR stopped recording. Tests indicated that a click would be heard on the CVR recording if the CVR circuit breaker had tripped normally, but not if it had been pulled out manually. As there was no click,  Captain Tsu likely pulled out the CVR circuit breaker while leaving the cockpit. The NTSC and NTSB investigators thought that if Captain Tsu were responsible for the crash, he must have made up some excuse to get the first officer to leave the flight deck before disabling the FDR (which would have immediately triggered a Master Caution on both pilots' control panels), so that his actions would not be noticed. Several minutes later, as recorded by Indonesian ground radar, the aircraft entered a rapid descent, disintegrated, and crashed into the Musi River.

On 14 December 2000, after three years of investigation, the Indonesian NTSC issued its final report. The NTSC chairman overrode the findings of his investigators—that the crash was caused deliberately by pilot input—so that the report stated that the evidence was inconclusive and that the cause of the accident could not be determined.

The US NTSB, which also participated in the investigation, concluded that the evidence was consistent with a deliberate manipulation of the flight controls, most likely by the captain.

In a letter to the NTSC dated 11 December 2000, the NTSB wrote:

The examination of all of the factual evidence is consistent with the conclusions that:

1) no airplane-related mechanical malfunctions or failures caused or contributed to the accident, and

2) the accident can be explained by intentional pilot action. Specifically,

a) the accident airplane’s flight profile is consistent with sustained manual nose-down flight control inputs;

b) the evidence suggests that the cockpit voice recorder (CVR) was intentionally disconnected;

c) recovery of the airplane was possible but not attempted; and

d) it is more likely that the nose-down flight control inputs were made by the captain than by the first officer.

Geoffrey Thomas of The Sydney Morning Herald said, "a secret report confirmed that the Indonesian authorities would not issue a public verdict because they feared it would make their own people too frightened to fly." Santoso Sayogo, an NTSC investigator who worked on the SilkAir 185 case, said that the NTSB opinion was shared by some Indonesian investigators, who were overruled by their boss.

Potential motives
In the aftermath of the crash, several potential motives for the captain's alleged suicide and homicide were suggested, including recent financial losses of $1.2 million (his share-trading showed trading of more than one million shares and his securities-trading privileges had been suspended 10 days before the accident due to nonpayment), his obtaining a $600,000 life insurance policy the previous week, which was to have gone into effect on the day of the accident (though it later emerged that this was a routine policy taken out as part of a mortgage requirement), his receipt of several recent disciplinary actions on the part of the airline (including one that related to improper manipulation of the CVR circuit breaker), and the loss of four squadron mates during his military flight training, 18 years earlier on the exact date of the crash. He had also had several conflicts with Ward and other co-pilots who had questioned his command suitability. Investigations later revealed that his total assets were greater than his liabilities, although his liquid assets could not cover his immediate debts; his monthly income was less than his family's monthly expenditure; and he had some outstanding credit card debts.

An official investigation by the Singapore Police Force into evidence of criminal offence leading to the crash found "no evidence that the pilot, copilot, or any crew member had suicidal tendencies or a motive to deliberately cause the crash of [the aircraft]".

Tsu was formerly a Republic of Singapore Air Force pilot, and had over 20 years of flying experience in the older T/A-4S Skyhawks, as well as the newer T/A-4SU Super Skyhawks. His last appointment was instructor pilot of a Skyhawk squadron.

CVR and FDR deactivation
The CVR and FDR stopped recording minutes before the abrupt descent, but not at the same time. The CVR stopped functioning about 6 minutes before the dive as the captain was leaving the cockpit for a short break. The FDR was deactivated 5 minutes later around 1 minute before the dive. Overload and short-circuit tests show that a distinctive 400-Hz tone is recorded by the CVR when the CVR circuit breaker trips. The investigators could not find this sound on Flight 185's CVR, which made them conclude that the CVR circuit breaker was manually pulled out. The radio continued to work after the failure of the CVR, which indicates that power failure was not the cause. Subsequent investigations, including a National Geographic Channel documentary, revealed that this FDR had previously failed, for periods lasting between 10 seconds and 10 minutes. Testing of the unit by NTSC found no evidence that a malfunction or failure caused either recorder to stop recording data.

Servo valve issue

Starting in 1991, several accidents and incidents involving the Boeing 737 were the result of uncommanded movement of their rudders. On 3 March 1991, United Airlines Flight 585, a 737-200, crashed in Colorado Springs, Colorado, killing 25 people. On 8 September 1994, USAir Flight 427, a 737-300, crashed near Pittsburgh, Pennsylvania, killing 132 people.  Four more incidents occurred where a 737 rudder PCU malfunction was suspected.

The Seattle Times devoted a series of 37 articles to Boeing 737 loss-of-control malfunctions. The accident occurred in the middle of a controversy over the NTSB's role in accidents caused by the rudder control unit.

During the investigation of Flight 427, the NTSB discovered that the PCU's dual servo valve could jam, as well, and deflect the rudder in the opposite direction of the pilots' input, due to thermal shock, caused when cold PCUs are injected with hot hydraulic fluid. As a result of this finding, the FAA ordered the servo valves to be replaced and new training protocol for pilots to handle unexpected movement of flight controls to be developed. The FAA ordered an upgrade of all Boeing 737 rudder control systems by 12 November 2002.

According to the series Mayday, the rudder issue had been corrected before construction started on the accident aircraft. Nevertheless, the theory of a rudder malfunction was investigated with the possibility of corrosion of and/or debris getting stuck in the PCU, and was disproved.

Aftermath

Lawsuits
SilkAir paid USD$10,000 compensation to each victim's family, the maximum under the Warsaw Convention. Boeing also paid an undisclosed amount of compensation. In 2001, six families who had sued SilkAir for damages based on the allegation that the crash was caused by the pilot were turned down by a Singapore High Court judge, who ruled that "the onus of proving that flight MI185 was intentionally crashed has not been discharged."

Although the NTSB and Parker-Hannifin had already ruled out the possibility of mechanical failure as a cause to the crash of Flight 185 due to a defective PCU servo valve-unit (manufactured by Parker-Hannifin), an independent and private investigation refocused on and further examined the recovered PCU device whose malfunctioning has been pointed out in other sudden Boeing 737 crashes. The manufacturer's records relating to this particular unit revealed that it had failed some routine tests, but they claimed to have corrected these problems. A metals expert, with the use of images from a scanning electron microscope, concluded that the servo valve had 'chip-outs' and numerous burrs "that could easily have interfered with the smooth operation of the valve". After this investigation was complete, in 2004, a Los Angeles Superior Court jury in the United States, which was not allowed to hear or consider the NTSB's conclusions about the accident, found that the crash was caused by a defective servo valve in the plane's rudder. The hydraulic PCU device manufacturer, Parker-Hannifin, was ordered to pay the three families of victims involved in that case US$43.6 million. After threatening to appeal the verdict, Parker-Hannifin later compensated all families involved (although it did not accept liability).

Parker-Hannifin spokesperson Lorrie Paul Crum stated that a federal law disallowed them from using the NTSB final report as evidence in the company's favor during the lawsuit. The lawyer representing the plaintiffs, Walter Lack, stated that the law only disallowed using the NTSB report's conclusion and suggestions, while statements of fact are admissible. USC §1154. Discovery and use of cockpit and surface vehicle recordings and transcripts states: "No part of a report of the Board, related to an accident or an investigation of an accident, may be admitted into evidence or used in a civil action for damages resulting from a matter mentioned in the report."

Memorials
A memorial for the victims was erected at the burial site, which is located within the Botanical Gardens near Palembang. Another memorial is located at Choa Chu Kang Cemetery in Singapore.

Dramatisation
The Discovery Channel Canada / National Geographic TV series Mayday (also called Air Crash Investigation or Air Disasters) dramatised the accident in a 2012 episode titled Pushed to the Limit (broadcast in some countries as Pilot Under Pressure).

In popular culture 
Singaporean singer JJ Lin's 2013 song "Practice Love" from the album Stories Untold is based on this accident, as a close friend of the artist, Xu Chue Fern, was killed on the flight.

See also 

 Aviation safety
 List of accidents and incidents involving commercial aircraft
 List of aircraft accidents and incidents resulting in at least 50 fatalities
 
 
 SilkAir 185: Pilot Suicide?
 Suicide by pilot

Specific incidents involving pilot suicide
 EgyptAir Flight 990, another disputed crash involving pilot suicide
 Germanwings Flight 9525
 Japan Airlines Flight 350
 LAM Mozambique Airlines Flight 470
 Royal Air Maroc Flight 630

Specific incidents involving rudder/mechanical problems
 American Airlines Flight 1
 American Airlines Flight 587
 Eastwind Airlines Flight 517
 Indonesia AirAsia Flight 8501
 Northwest Airlines Flight 85
 United Airlines Flight 585
 USAir Flight 427

Notes

References

Further reading
 
 
 "印尼国家交通安全委员会调查结论：没有证据显示朱卫民　股票交易影响飞行表现." [Indonesian National Transportation Safety Commission Survey Conclusion: There is no evidence that Tsu Wai Ming's stock trading affects flight performance]  Lianhe Zaobao. 15 December 2000. (Archive)
 Pan, Junqin (潘君琴 Pān Jūnqín) and Lin Shunhua (林顺华 Lín Shùnhuá). "胜安空难诉讼案 副机师：朱卫民曾尝试以"令人怕"方式降陆." [Shengan Air Combat Lawsuit Deputy pilot: Tsu Wai Ming tried to land in a "scary" way]  Lianhe Zaobao. 7 April 2001. (Archive)

External links
National Transportation Safety Committee
Final Report transcript
Final report
Revised final report (revision done in 2001)
National Transportation Safety Board
Cockpit Voice Recorder transcript
CVR sound spectrum study
Flight Data Recorder readout
11 December 2000 letter to the NTSC
 SilkAir Press Release (Archive Alt archive)
SilkAir news releases regarding Flight 185 (Archive Alt archive)

Airliner accidents and incidents involving deliberate crashes
Accidents and incidents involving the Boeing 737 Classic
Aviation accidents and incidents in 1997
Aviation accidents and incidents in Indonesia
Aviation accident investigations with disputed causes
Mass murder in 1997
Murder–suicides in Indonesia
185
December 1997 events in Asia